Jorge Bartual Medina (born 18 August 1971) is a Spanish retired footballer who played as a goalkeeper.

Club career
Born in Valencia, Bartual spent most of his career with local Valencia CF, playing his first five years as a senior with the B-team, the last three in Segunda División B. He was definitely promoted to the main squad for the 1995–96 season, making his La Liga debut on 24 January 1996 in a 5–2 away win against Real Valladolid, after Andoni Zubizarreta injured himself in the warmup. 

During his spell with the Che, however, Bartual never managed to be more than second or third-choice, successively being understudy to Zubizarreta, Santiago Cañizares and Andrés Palop and conceding 14 goals in his league appearances. He was on the substitutes bench for the 1999–2000 UEFA Champions League final, against Real Madrid.

In the 2001 winter transfer window, Bartual left Valencia and signed with CD Tenerife in Segunda División, where he failed to appear. He retired in June of the following year at not yet 31 after one season with Tercera División side CD Quintanar del Rey, and later rejoined his main club as goalkeeper coach for the youth teams.

Honours
Copa del Rey: 1998–99
UEFA Champions League: Runner-up 1999–2000
UEFA Intertoto Cup: 1998

References

External links

CiberChe biography and stats 

1971 births
Living people
Footballers from Valencia (city)
Spanish footballers
Association football goalkeepers
La Liga players
Segunda División B players
Tercera División players
Valencia CF Mestalla footballers
Valencia CF players
CD Tenerife players